The Stadion Gdańskiego Ośrodka Sportu (Gdańsk Sports Center Stadium), sometimes officially called the Lechia Gdańsk Stadion or simply the Lechia Stadion is a multi-purpose stadium in Gdańsk, Poland. The stadium has a capacity for about 12,000 people, however it held 40,000 spectators during a match between Lechia Gdańsk and Italian side Juventus. The stadium was formerly called the "Stadium of the City Centre of Sports and Relaxation", and was known as Stadion MOSiR for short, until the Gdańsk Sports Center took over the running of the stadium in 2000.

The ground was once the major centre of all sporting activities for the Lechia Gdańsk sports club. The ground was in the centre of a complex which included tennis courts, and an additional football pitch. After the Stadium was rebuilt after being damaged during the Second World War Lechia stopped playing football matches on fields in Gdańsk and made the stadium their home. The stadium hosted all games for the football and rugby teams for over 60 years before the facilities had become too outdated. 

The Lechia Gdańsk men's football team played all of their home matches at the stadium from 1945 until 2011 when they moved to Stadion Energa Gdańsk which had been built for Euro 2012. RC Lechia Gdańsk started playing at the stadium from 1956, currently mainly playing at the specialised rugby pitch at the Gdańsk Athletics and Rugby Stadium, however the rugby team still plays games at the stadium, especially games against their main rivals RC Arka Gdynia. The stadium also formerly held games for Lechia Lechia Gdańsk II who had used the stadium for home games sporadically from 1963 until 2005, when the second team was fully integrated into the Lechia set-up and used the stadium for all their home games until 2019.

Currently the stadium is mostly only used for footballing purposes. It is the home stadium for the Lechia Gdańsk Ladies team, and is used for training purposes by the men's senior team. Occasionally Lechia Gdańsk Rugby also use the stadium when they have major games where a large crowd is expected.

Facilities
During the 2007–08 winter break the some of the stadiums and training grounds facilities were updated, including heated turf, more modern floodlights (emitting 2,000 lux), a semi-artificial pitch surface, two new training pitches, tennis courts, an updated gymnasium and athletic hall, and a hotel and office building.

Internationals

Poland national football team

The Poland national football team only played once at the stadium, when Poland played Cyprus in the qualification rounds for the 1988 European Championships.

Euro 2012

During the Euro 2012 finals the German national team chose Gdańsk as their base and the Gdańsk Sports Center Stadium as their training ground.

Avenue of Stars
At the MOSiR Stadium Lechia have an "Avenue of Stars" which commemorates the efforts and success of former players and coaches from the senior football team. There are currently 21 players with stars at the stadium, including all-time top goal scorer, Roman Rogocz, and all-time appearance maker, Zdzisław Puszkarz. Due to MOSiR becoming the training ground in 2011 after the move to the PGE Arena Gdańsk there have been calls for the stars to be moved to the new stadium by some fans, while others see the stadium as the historic home of Lechia Gdańsk and the perfect place to keep the players commemorative stars.

Those people who have received stars are;

Concerts

David Bowie was scheduled to perform at the stadium during his Earthling Tour on July 27, 1997, but the show was cancelled.

References

External links
Stadium statistics at Stadiony.net (in Polish)
Stadium information at Lechia Gdańsk official club website (in Polish)
MOSiR Stadium (in Russian)

Football venues in Poland
Multi-purpose stadiums in Poland
Lechia Gdańsk
Buildings and structures in Gdańsk
Tourist attractions in Gdańsk
Sports venues in Pomeranian Voivodeship